Damnation Alley is an EP by American heavy metal band Bitch, and was released on the Metal Blade Records label. The EP-length release has the distinction of being the first album by a single artist and the second album of any kind released on Metal Blade Records (the first was the 1982 compilation album Metal Massacre).

Track listing
All tracks written by Bitch

 "Saturdays" (4:16)
 "Never Come Home" (2:52)
 "Damnation Alley" (4:00)
 "He's Gone" (3:37)
 "Live for the Whip" (5:53)

Personnel

Band members
Betsy Bitch - lead vocals
David Carruth - guitar
Mark Anthony Webb - bass
Robby Settles - drums

Additional musicians
Richard Zusman - bass

References

External links
 Bitch Discography at Betsybitch.com

1982 albums
Metal Blade Records EPs